Devonshire House is an 18th-century house at 44 Vicarage Crescent, Battersea, London. It is a listed Grade II* on the National Heritage List for England along with its iron gate and railings. The interior of the house contains its original paneling.

References

Houses completed in the 18th century
Grade II* listed buildings in the London Borough of Wandsworth
Grade II* listed houses in London
Houses in the London Borough of Wandsworth
Buildings and structures in Battersea
18th-century architecture in the United Kingdom